Pterostylis karri, commonly known as the karri snail orchid, is a species of orchid endemic to the south-west of Western Australia. Both flowering and non-flowering plants usually have a small rosette of leaves and flowering plants have a single green and white flower with unusually long, erect lateral sepals. Like some similar greenhoods, it often forms dense colonies.

Description
The dorsal sepal and petals are fused, forming a hood or "galea" over the column. The labellum is large but not visible from outside the flower. Flowering occurs from August to early December.

Taxonomy and naming
Pterostylis karri was first formally described in 2014 by David Jones and Christopher French from a specimen collected south of Mandurah and the description was published in Australian Orchid Review. The species had previously been known as Pterostylis sp. 'karri' or Pterostylis sp. 'karri forest'.<ref name=APNI>{{cite web|title=Pterostylis Pterostylis sp. 'karri'''|url=https://id.biodiversity.org.au/instance/apni/783641|publisher=APNI|accessdate=27 July 2017}}</ref> The specific epithet (karri) refers to the karri (Eucalyptus diversicolor) forest where this species often grows.

Distribution and habitat
The karri snail orchid grows in moist places in shady forest and around granite outcrops between Walpole and Margaret River in the Jarrah Forest, Swan Coastal Plain and Warren biogeographic regions.

ConservationPterostylis karri'' is classified as "not threatened" by the Western Australian Government Department of Parks and Wildlife.

References

karri
Endemic orchids of Australia
Orchids of Western Australia
Plants described in 2014